Sir Cyril Wyche, 1st Baronet ( – 1756) was an English diplomat who served as Envoy Extraordinary to Hamburg Envoy Extraordinary and Minister Plenipotentiary to Russia.

Early life
He was the only son and heir of Bethesda ( Savage) Wyche and John Wyche of Hockwold cum Wilton, Envoy Extraordinary at Hamburg and a daughter Sophia who married Dr Thomas Thomas, Rector of Peterborough. He was the grandson of Sir Peter Wyche (the English Ambassador to Russia and Poland), the great-grandson of Sir Peter Wyche (the British Ambassador to the Ottoman Empire) and the grand-nephew of Sir Cyril Wyche, MP and Chief Secretary for Ireland.

Career
At the age of nineteen, he was appointed Chargé d'Affaires at Hamburg by Queen Anne serving from 1713 to 1714 succeeding his father who died on 15 October 1713. Following the succession of George I on 1 August 1714, the new King appointed Resident in 1714, Minister in 1725, and Envoy Extraordinary to Lower Saxony. While at Hamburg, his secretary, Mathyson, "had Handel for his music-master, and was himself a fine player on the harpsicord."

On 20 December 1729, he was created baronet of Chewton in the County of Somerset, in the Baronetage of Great Britain. He also served as High Sheriff of Norfolk from 1729 to 1730.

In 1741, he was appointed Envoy Extraordinary and Minister Plenipotentiary to Russia, serving until 1744.

Personal life
In 1714, Wyche was married to Anne von Wedderkop, daughter of Magnus von Wedderkop, Prime Minister to the Duke of Holstein. As her dowry, her father gifted his property of Tangstedt. Her brother was Gottfriend von Wedderkop. Together, they were the parents of two sons and two daughters: 

 Magnus Wyche (d. 1740), an Ensign in the British Army who died unmarried.
 John Wyche, who died young.
 Frederike Wyche, who married before 1741, Magnus von Holmer, Councilor of the State to the Duke of Holstein. 
 Amelia Wyche.

As Sir Cyril had no surviving sons, the title became extinct upon his death at Tangstedt in 1756. Upon his death, his daughter Frederike inherited Tangstedt in 1756.

References

External links

1690s births
1756 deaths
British diplomats
Ambassadors of Great Britain to Russia
Baronets in the Baronetage of Great Britain
High Sheriffs of Norfolk